"Running Away with You" is a song recorded by Canadian country music artist Thomas Wade. It was released in 1999 as the first single from his debut solo album, Lucky 13. It peaked at number 9 on the RPM Country Tracks chart in October 1999.

Chart performance

Year-end charts

References

1999 songs
1999 singles
Thomas Wade (singer) songs